Trust No One: The Hunt for the Crypto King is a Netflix original documentary film directed by Luke Sewell. Its story follows a group of cryptocurrency investors who investigate the untimely death of their exchange's founder, Gerry Cotten as well as the $250 million that they suspect he stole from them. The film was released on March 30, 2022.

Between March 27, 2022 to April 3, 2022, the film saw over 12 million viewing hours on Netflix globally.

References

External links 

 
 

2022 films
2022 documentary films
True crime
Netflix original documentary films
English-language Netflix original films
2020s English-language films